Mokbel is a surname. Notable people with the surname include:

Dahlia Mokbel (born 1969), Egyptian swimmer
Kefah Mokbel (born 1965), Syrian-born UK-based surgeon
Tony Mokbel (born 1965), Australian criminal